The Arsenic Act 1851 (14 & 15 Vict c 13) was an Act of the Parliament of the United Kingdom, passed in 1851, during the reign of Queen Victoria. Arsenic was at the time widely used as a pigment and in agricultural products such as sheep dressings; the Act was introduced to address increasing public concern over accidental and deliberate arsenic poisonings.

The definition of arsenic for the purposes of the Act included "Arsenious Acid and the Arsenites, Arsenic Acid and the Arseniates, and all other colourless poisonous Preparations of Arsenic". The Act required those selling such products to maintain a written and signed record of those to whom they had sold arsenic, including the quantity and its stated purpose. It also required that unless the arsenic was to be used for a purpose that would make such treatment unsuitable, for example in medical or agricultural applications, it had to be coloured with either soot or indigo. The maximum penalty for breaching the terms of the Act, or providing false information, was £20, equivalent to about £13,000 as of 2014.

The Act did not restrict who was allowed to sell arsenic, as until the Pharmacy Act 1868 there was no legal definition of a pharmacist. Section 17 of the Pharmacy Act 1868 provided that "nothing in this Act contained shall repeal or affect any of the provisions" of the Arsenic Act 1851. The Arsenic Act 1851 was repealed by the Pharmacy and Poisons Act 1933. The Arsenic Act 1851 is repealed for the Republic of Ireland by the Poisons Act, 1961.

See also
1858 Bradford sweets poisoning

References

Notes

Citations

Bibliography

Arnold, Thomas James. "Arsenic". Summary of the Duties of a Justice of the Peace Out of Sessions: Summary Convictions. Henry Sweet. V and R Stevens and G S Norton. William Maxwell. London. 1860. Pages 31 to 33.

"The Arsenic Act, 1851". Halsbury's Statutes of England. (The Complete Statutes of England). First Edition. Butterworth & Co (Publishers) Ltd. Bell Yard, Temple Bar, London. 1930. Volume 11. Page 662.
Lely, John Mounteney. "The Arsenic Act, 1851". The Statutes of Practical Utility. (Chitty's Statutes). Fifth Edition. Sweet and Maxwell. Stevens and Sons. London. 1895. Volume 9. Title "Poison". Pages 1 and 2. 

Arsenic
Legal history of England
Toxicology in the United Kingdom
United Kingdom Acts of Parliament 1851
United Kingdom public law